Edmonton was a federal electoral district represented in the House of Commons of Canada. It was located initially in the Northwest Territories, and following its creation in 1905, the province of Alberta (although between 1905 and 1907 Edmonton also included parts of Saskatchewan). This riding was created in 1903, and was abolished in 1914 when it was redistributed into Edmonton East, Edmonton West and Strathcona ridings.

Members of Parliament 
The only person ever to represent this riding was Edmonton Liberal newspaper publisher Frank Oliver who was Minister of the Interior at a time when Alberta was being settled by European immigrants, and when Alberta joined Confederation as a province in 1905.

Election results

By-election: On Mr. Oliver being appointed Minister of Interior, 8 April 1905

See also 
 Edmonton Alberta provincial electoral district.
 Edmonton Northwest Territories territorial electoral district.
 List of Canadian federal electoral districts
 Past Canadian electoral districts

External links 
 
  
 

 

Former federal electoral districts of Northwest Territories
Former federal electoral districts of Saskatchewan
Former federal electoral districts of Alberta
Politics of Edmonton